Trinity Preparatory School of Florida is an independent college preparatory day-school for students in grades 6 to 12, located in Winter Park, a suburb of Orlando. It is affiliated with the Episcopal Church and is accredited by the Florida Council of Independent Schools.

Trinity Prep was established in 1969 by Rev. Canon A Rees Hay. The first class had 173 students and served the grades 7-12.

Trinity Preparatory School is ranked No.1 private high school, No.1 high school for STEM, No.1 Christian high school, and No. 2 college prep private high school in the Orlando area by Niche. In 2019, Trinity Prep was voted a top private school for grades 9-12 as well as grades 6-8 in the Orlando Magazine "Best of Orlando 2019."

Academics

Upper school students are required to complete 22 credits in order to graduate, in English, mathematics, foreign languages, social studies, science, fine arts, computer science, life management, and physical education.

Trinity Preparatory School has 96 degree-holding faculty members. More than 60 have earned at least a Master's degree in their field and five have doctorates. There is an 11:1 student to faculty ratio, and the average class size is 17 students in the 2019-20 school year.

Trinity Prep's Class of 2019 had 30 students recognized by the National Merit Scholarship as high scorers, and 17 students as National Merit semifinalists, more than any other school in Central Florida.

All of Trinity Prep students go on college after graduation, and $12 million is awarded annually in merit and athletic scholarships.

Athletics
In 2019-20, Trinity Prep had 59 sports teams in 18 sports at the varsity, junior varsity, and middle school levels. Autumn-term teams include bowling, cross country, football, golf, swimming and diving, and volleyball. Winter-term teams include basketball and soccer. Spring teams include baseball, softball, lacrosse, tennis, track and field, and weightlifting.

Trinity Prep generally falls under the 2A size classification but competes in both 1A and 3A as well. Trinity Prep won the FHSAA All-Sports Award for Class 2A in 2002-03 and for Class 2A Private in 2003-04 and 2010-11. The All-Sports Award is awarded to the top-rated athletics program in each size classification in a given year.

The Girls Varsity Softball team has won three state championships.

In 2013, Mike Kruczek was appointed Head Varsity Football Coach.

The Boys Cross Country team has won eight state championships (1996, 2007, 2009, 2010, 2013, 2014, 2015, and 2016).

The Saints' traditional rival, Lake Highland Prep, has recently been replaced by other area schools that have remained in Trinity's size classification. Among these schools are The First Academy of Orlando and Holy Trinity Episcopal Academy of Melbourne.

Extracurricular activities 
The Trinity Voice, the school's student news publication, published articles on current events, school news, pop culture. In 2020, The Trinity Voice was named one of the seven best high school publications in Florida by the Florida Scholastic Press Association.

Trinity Prep's speech and debate team is nationally recognized for their performances. The team finished within the top 20 nationally in 2020, and finished 5th in the State in 2021. Notable performances by Trinity Prep debaters include winning the prestigious high school Tournament of Champions in 2018 in public forum debate.

Notable alumni
 Winston DuBose (1973), professional soccer player
 Whit Watson (1989), Emmy Award-winning sportscaster for Golf Channel
 Pardis Sabeti (1993), Rhodes scholar, Harvard professor, computational biologist, medical geneticist and evolutionary geneticist
 Matthew L. Golsteyn (1998), U.S. Army officer charged in 2018 with murder but pardoned in 2019 by President Donald Trump
 Will Proctor (2002), professional football player
 Jazzy Danziger (2003), poet and winner of the 2012 Brittingham Prize in Poetry
 Eric Wilbur (2003), professional football player
 Sam Saunders (2006), professional golfer and grandson of Arnold Palmer
 Denée Benton (2010), theater and television actress, currently starring in "Natasha, Pierre, & The Great Comet of 1812" on Broadway
 Hank Lebioda (2012), professional golfer
 Max Moroff (2012), professional baseball player
 Alex Balfanz, video game developer
 Mohammed Dewji, Tanzanian billionaire businessman and former politician

References

External links
 Trinity Preparatory School website
 Satellite map of campus (Google Maps)

Educational institutions established in 1966
Private high schools in Florida
High schools in Orange County, Florida
Buildings and structures in Winter Park, Florida
Private middle schools in Florida
1966 establishments in Florida
Episcopal schools in the United States